Song of the Sarong (1945) is a musical film starring Nancy Kelly and William Gargan.  The film was written by Gene Lewis and directed by Harold Young.

Plot

There are valuable pearls worth millions of dollars being guarded by a formidable tribe of natives on the island of Kashira in the South Seas.  Adventurer Drew Allen, who was once stranded on Kashira accepts an offer to recover the pearls.  A thunderstorm, emergency landing, stowaways, and a confrontation with the natives complicate things.  Trials and tribulations result in an island being converted to Christianity.

Cast
Nancy Kelly ....  Sharon 
William Gargan ....  Drew 
Eddie Quillan ....  Tony 
Fuzzy Knight ....  Pete 
George Dolenz ....  Kalo 
George Cleveland ....  Reemis 
Mariska Aldrich ....  Mabu 
Morgan Wallace ....  Adams 
Larry Keating ....  Potter 
Robert Barron ....  Jolo (as Bob Barron) 
Pete G. Katchenaro ....  Servant 
Jack Slattery ....  Announcer 
Jay Silverheels ....  Spearman (as Silverheels Smith) 
Al Kikume ....  Guard 
George Bruggeman ....  Native 
Clarence Lung ....  Leader 
William Desmond....  Councillor 
Jack Curtis ....  Councillor

External links 
 
 

1945 films
1945 musical films
Films directed by Harold Young (director)
American musical films
American black-and-white films
Films scored by Edward Ward (composer)
1940s English-language films
1940s American films